A Time Forgotten is the second collaborative remix album by vocalist Destini Beard and Midnight Syndicate, the first being the 2010 EP, The Dark Masquerade. The album blends Destini's original lyrics and vocals with previously released songs from Midnight Syndicate's albums. The theme of A Time Forgotten centers around a once-thriving Victorian-era hotel that has suffered a fire and is now haunted by its past residents. The album also included an original song written and performed by Destini entitled, My Last Goodbye,<ref>Interview with Destini Beard, Drive-In of the Dead, June 2012</ref> and an electro dance remix of Farewell Forever from The Dark Masquerade EP by Pat Berdysz of Encoder.

 Background and production 
In an interview with HorrorNews.net, vocalist, Destini Beard said this about the album:  Sonically, we wanted the CD to be reminiscent of a short musical, with multiple layers of harmonies and counter melodies on each song. The recording process took much longer than The Dark Masquerade but I feel the end product was worth every bit of it. I was especially pleased with how the musical variety works hand in hand with the lyrics to pull you further along on the adventure.

The electro dance remix of the song Farewell Forever (from The Dark Masquerade) was done by Pat Berdysz who also created the Dead and Buried electro dance remix of Midnight Syndicate's track, Graveyard, on The Dead Matter: Original Motion Picture Soundtrack.The Dead Matter: Original Motion Picture Soundtrack – Midnight Syndicate (2010, CD) on Discogs

 Track listing 

 Personnel 
Destini Beard – vocals, vocal arrangements, lyrics, (composer on My Last Goodbye'')
Edward Douglas – composer
Gavin Goszka – composer

Production 
Producers – Edward Douglas, Gavin Goszka
Mixing – Edward Douglas, Gavin Goszka
Mastering – Gavin Goszka
Cover Art and Layout – Ed Beard, Jr.
Engineering – Green Valley Recording

References

2012 albums
Midnight Syndicate albums
Destini Beard albums